Andrey Petrovich Kiselyov (December 12, 1852 – November 8, 1940) was a Russian and Soviet mathematician.

Biography 
Kiselyov attended the district school in Mtsensk and later enrolled at the Gymnasium in Oryol, the main city in the region. He graduated from the Gymnasium in 1871 with the gold medal and, in the same year, entered the Physics and Mathematics Faculty of St Petersburg University. In 1875, Kiselyov graduated from the university with a degree that allowed him to teach in a Gymnasium. He taught mathematics, mechanics, and drawing. It was at that time when he started writing his own textbooks.

Of the many textbooks he wrote, three became the staple of school mathematics texts in Russia for many years: Systematic Arithmetic Course for Secondary Schools (1884), Elementary Algebra (1888), and Elementary Geometry (1892-1893). These textbooks remained in use during the Soviet times. They were praised for clarity and good logical organization, despite having some logical gaps that were beyond the understanding of an ordinary student. Kiselyov himself suggested that the properties required of a good textbook were precision, simplicity, and conciseness. By the 1950s Kiselyov's Geometry was still in widespread use.

In the early 2000s these three titles were re-issued primarily to acquaint teachers of secondary schools with the style of mathematics education employed a century ago. Since then, these textbooks have seen an increased interest from teachers and students alike.

External links 
 https://web.archive.org/web/20081201153203/http://www.uvk2.artn.ru/kiselyov/eng/intro.html
 http://www.math.ru/history/people/kiselev
 Andrei Petrovich Kiselev at the MacTutor History of Mathematics archive

Geometry 
 Sumizdat, publisher of English translation of Geometry
  MAA review of Geometry

1852 births
1940 deaths
20th-century Russian educators
20th-century Russian mathematicians
People from Mtsensk
Recipients of the Order of the Red Banner of Labour
Recipients of the Order of St. Anna, 2nd class
Recipients of the Order of St. Anna, 3rd class
Recipients of the Order of Saint Stanislaus (Russian), 2nd class
Textbook writers
Russian educators
Russian mathematicians
Soviet educators
Soviet mathematicians